Harry McLean may refer to:

 H. Daniel McLean (1906–1964), merchant and political figure on Prince Edward Island
 Harry Falconer McLean (1881–1961), Canadian railway contractor and philanthropist